Kyriakou, sometimes transliterated as Kiriakou or Kyriacou, is a Greek Cypriot surname. Notable individuals with this surname include:

 Andreas Kyriakou, Cypriot association football player (born 1994)
 Andi Kyriacou, Irish rugby player (born 1983)
 Charalambos Kyriakou (footballer, born 1989), Cypriot association football player (born 1989)
 Charalambos Kyriakou (footballer born 1995), Cypriot association football player (born 1995)
 Demetris Kyriakou, Cypriot association football player (born 1986)
 Emanuel Kiriakou, US-American songwriter and producer
 John Kiriakou, US-American CIA analyst (born 1964)
 Kostas Kyriacou, Cypriot politician (born 1958)
 Kyriacos Kyriacou, Cypriot association football player (born 1989)
 Maria Elena Kiriakou, Cypriot singer, (born 1984)
 Michalis Kyriakou, stage name Mihalis Violaris, Cypriot singer (born 1944)
 Minos Kyriakou, Greek shipping magnate (born 1938)
 Rena Kyriakou, Greek pianist (1917–1994)
 Xenios Kyriacou, Cypriot association footballer (born 1979)

Greek-language surnames
Surnames